Olsenella scatoligenes is a Gram-positive, saccharolytic, non-spore-forming, strictly anaerobic and non-motile bacterium from the genus of Olsenella which has been isolated from faeces of a pig from the Aarhus University in Denmark.Olsenella scatoligenes produces 3-methylindole and 4-methylphenol.

References

 

Coriobacteriaceae
Bacteria described in 2015